Leonis Minorids [sic] (formerly Leo Minorids, IMO designation: LMI; IAU shower number: 22) is a weak meteor shower that takes place from October 19 till October 27 each year, peaking on October 23.  With a weak moon the meteor shower may be visible with the naked eye, however this meteor shower is best observed only from the Northern Hemisphere with telescopic plotting.  This meteor shower is linked to comet C/1739 K1 and radiates from the constellation Leo Minor, which is a faint constellation north of Leo.  The meteor shower often only produces 2 meteors an hour. The meteors usually pass at an average speed of 62 kilometers per second.

Notes 

Meteor showers
October events
Leo Minor